Mister Buddwing is a 1966 American film drama  starring James Garner, Jean Simmons, Suzanne Pleshette, Katharine Ross, and Angela Lansbury. Directed by Delbert Mann, the film depicts a well-dressed man who wakes up on a bench in Central Park with no idea who he is.  He proceeds to wander around Manhattan meeting women played by Lansbury, Ross, Pleshette, and Simmons desperately trying to figure out his own identity.

Based on the 1964 novel Buddwing by Evan Hunter, the black-and-white drama was written by Dale Wasserman, and accompanied by a jazz-based musical score written by Kenyon Hopkins.

In his memoirs, Garner said "I'd summarize the plot but to this day I have no clue what it is. Worst picture I ever made. What were they thinking? What was I thinking?"

Plot

A man (James Garner) wakes up on a New York park bench to find that his mind is a total blank. He has no identification or money on him, just a slip of paper in his pocket with a phone number on it enclosing two large white pills.

He rings the number, reaching Gloria (Angela Lansbury), who first mistakes him for her shiftless husband Sam.  Arranging a rendezvous, he creates a name for himself, appropriating "Sam" and cobbling "Buddwing" from the first two things that seize his attention, a Budweiser beer truck and an airplane.  Gloria, a liquor-sodden slattern, doesn't recognize him but gives him a handful of cash upon parting purely out of pity.

Trying to pull himself together over breakfast he sees a giant headline blaring the escape of a violently insane criminal.  Finding a possible match with one of the initials inside the ring he's wearing he immediately fears he's it.

Shortly he spots a woman on the street he thinks he knows and hails her as "Grace". A student at a music school in Washington Square, Janet (Katharine Ross) proves a stranger, but a flashback of a romance with her from college days goes through Buddwing's mind. In it he's the music student, she's "Grace", and they impulsively marry.  

Back in the park Janet rejects his attentions and creates a scene.  A policeman arrives, Buddwing is questioned, but flees when the patrolman becomes distracted by hecklers.

He's pursued by a mad street person, who raves that indeed the frightened man is the murderer on the loose. 
More spooked than ever Buddwing races away, ending up aimlessly roaming the sidewalks. Soon he meets coquettish actress "Fiddle" (Suzanne Pleshette). They have sex, after which he instinctively begins to play piano, jarring loose more fragments of his possible former identity.  Falling asleep in her arms he roils in a nightmare of fighting with her - by the name of Grace, and again his wife - over a pregnancy he feels they cannot afford.  He insists on an abortion.  Crushed, "Grace" climbs over the guardrail of the 59th Street Bridge, ready to commit suicide.  He arrives to save her just in time.

Snapping out of it, he flees once again, ending up buying a pint of whisky and looking for somewhere to paper-bag it alone. A socialite (Jean Simmons, "The Blonde") out for kicks on a scavenger hunt spies the tall, handsome man on the sidewalk. After boozing some together on the nearest stoop the pair end up in Harlem, seeking to clear $100,000 in a craps game to complete her list. Becoming woozy, Buddwing once again lapses into a conscious flashback, this time with The Blonde as his troubled wife Grace.  In spite of having achieved success the couple has lost everything: she is a miserable tramp, unable to get over an abortion that left her sterile, he's trapped in his own web of affluence at the expense of honoring his inborn talent.

In his trance he sees a blood-spattered vanity top and a razor blade.

Like a lightning bolt it dawns on him he'd dialed the right phone number in the wrong area code that morning.  It wasn't for "Monument" on the Upper West Side of Manhattan, it was for Mt. Kisco up in Westchester County.  He calls, it's a hospital, and it all starts to come together for him: he had married Grace, she had had an abortion, they never could have a family, he had indeed sacrificed his talent for success as an A&R man just like he had told her intended to, and revolted her.  And she had slashed her wrists...but was still alive.  Just barely.

He begs to be able to see her.  He takes her lifeless arm.  He fears her last breaths are ebbing away.  Slowly the limb moves, beckoning his hands.  He takes her hand and clasps it in his, sharing his rediscovered life force with her.

Cast
 James Garner as Mr. Buddwing
 Jean Simmons as The Blonde
 Suzanne Pleshette as Fiddle Corwin
 Katharine Ross as Janet
 Angela Lansbury as Gloria
 George Voskovec as Shabby Old Man
 Jack Gilford as Mr. Schwartz
 Joe Mantell as 1st cab driver
 Billy Halop as 2nd cab driver
 Raymond St. Jacques as Hank
 Ken Lynch as Dan
 Nichelle Nichols as Dice Player
 Charles Seel as Printer

Reception

Awards and honors
The film was nominated for two Academy Awards; for Best Costume Design, Black and White (Helen Rose) and Best Art Direction, Black and White (George Davis, Paul Groesse, Henry Grace, and Hugh Hunt).

See also
 List of American films of 1966

Notes

External links
 
 
 
 
 James Garner Interview on the Charlie Rose Show
 James Garner interview at Archive of American Television

1966 films
American drama films
American black-and-white films
1966 drama films
Films about amnesia
Films based on American novels
Films directed by Delbert Mann
Films scored by Kenyon Hopkins
Films set in New York City
Metro-Goldwyn-Mayer films
1960s English-language films
1960s American films